Animal Resources Authority is a Western Australian government authority.

As an authority within the Western Australian Health Department portfolio, it governs and regulates the usage of animals in scientific laboratories.

At a national level, guidelines and codes exist in the same area  and organizations that have animal welfare in focus.

See also 
 Animal welfare and rights in Australia

Notes

Statutory agencies of Western Australia
Animal welfare organisations based in Australia